Sinocyamodus is an extinct genus of placodont reptile from the Late Triassic (Tuvalian) Xiaowa Formation of China. Only one species, Sinocyamodus xinpuensis, is currently assigned to this genus. This genus was the first placodont to be discovered in the eastern Tethys, overthrowing traditional views that the group was restricted to the western Tethys.

The first adult specimen of this genus was reported in 2018, and showed a number of morphological differences with previously discovered sub-adult material indicating developmental changes with age.

References 

Placodonts
Anisian life
Late Triassic reptiles of Asia
Triassic China
Fossils of China
Fossil taxa described in 2000
Sauropterygian genera